Ewa Ewart (born 13 March 1956 in Warsaw) is a Polish journalist and an award-winning filmmaker who specializes in groundbreaking and influential documentaries.

Early life 
She was born and raised in Warsaw, Poland, but she has spent most of her career based at the BBC TV in London, England.

Ewa Ewart is a graduate of the University of Warsaw with a degree in Spanish language and culture.

Career 
In the early 1980s she worked as a translator and a reporter for the Spanish news agency EFE in its Warsaw bureau.

After leaving the country in the mid-1980s, she continued her work for EFE in London, UK.

In the years 1985-1990, she was based in Washington, DC, where she was a reporter for the BBC World Service, Polish Section and a Freelance producer for some international TV networks based in Washington DC. (in the United States, avoiding repetition of Washington DC).

In 1990 she moved to Moscow where she worked as a news producer for the American television network CBS in the Moscow Bureau.

In 1993 she returned to Great Britain and began her career as a producer and director for the BBC TV Current Affairs Department. She worked for flagships international documentary programs such as Assignment, Correspondent and This World. 

She has traveled and worked in many countries of the world, producing and directing programs ranging from investigations and political and social observational documentaries.

Ewa Ewart has been a freelancer since 2012. She works on a regular basis for TVN24 and TVN24Bis, American owned commercial channels in Poland, where she is the presenter of an international documentary strand.

Filmography

External links

 
A child of Beslan by Ewa Ewart BBC News
Zamrażam swoje emocje - interview with Ewa Ewart 
Ewa Ewart at the Filmpolski.pl Database

Awards and recognition 

 1998: BAFTA nomination for ETA - Coming in From the Cold.
 2000: Premis Actual International Award - No Experience Necessary.
 2004: Access to Evil RTS (Royal Television Society) Award, Amnesty International Award, The Foreign Press Association Award, CINE Award, Golden Globe Award and Grand Prix Golden Globe.
 2005/2006: Children of Beslan BAFTA Nomination, Double Emmy nomination (Best Director and Best Camera), Amnesty International Nomination. Two RTS Awards (categories: Best Documentary and Best Journalism), FIPA Award, CINE Award, Peabody Award, BANFF Award, One World Award.
 2009: Andrzej Wojciechowski Award in recognition for her documentaries series.
 2009: Nominated for Grand Press Award, Poland - Journalist of the Year.
 2010: Received the Wiktor Award, Poland - for the Best TV Programme.
 2011: Nominated for Grand Press Award, Poland - Journalist of the Year.
 2012: Winner of the Wiktor Award, Poland - for the Best TV Programme.
 2014: Winner of MediaTory – annual Award given by Polish Students of Journalism.
 2014: Red Gold: The Inside Story of Poland’s Biggest Copper Deal Winner of Silver Globe, World Media Festival in Hamburg, Germany.
 2014: Winner of Outstanding Personality of the Year – European Business Forum.
 2015: Winner of Jerzy Zimowski Award- Poland’s Institute of Public Affairs.
 2017: Winner of MediaTory - Authority of the Year - annual prize awarded by Polish Students of Journalism.
 2020: Winner of the Honorary Award of Polish Human Rights Commissioner "For Services to the Protection of Human Rights". Winner of the Amnesty International Poland Lifetime Award in the Media for Human Rights

References 

Living people
Polish film directors
Polish women film directors
Polish film producers
Polish women film producers
1956 births